Auguste-Rosalie Bisson (01/05/1826 – 22/04/1900) was a French photographer, active from 1841 to the year of his death, 1900. He was born and died in Paris and was the son of the heraldic painter, Louis-François Bisson and the brother of Louis-Auguste Bisson.

He was the first person to take pictures from the summit of Mont Blanc, in the summer of 1861. While making this expedition, he took 25 porters to carry his equipment.

References
 Anglo-American Name Authority File, s.v. "Bisson, Auguste-Rosalie", LC Control Number no 99059153, cited 7 February 2006
 Union List of Artists Names, s.v. "Bisson, Auguste-Rosalie", cited 7 February 2006

See also

1826 births
1900 deaths
19th-century French photographers